Tsumilukh is a rural locality (a selo) and the administrative center of Saniortinsky Selsoviet, Tlyaratinsky District, Republic of Dagestan, Russia. The population was 993 as of 2010.

Geography 
Tsumilukh is located 19 km southeast of Tlyarata (the district's administrative centre) by road. Rosnob is the nearest rural locality.

References 

Rural localities in Tlyaratinsky District